Cotoname was a Pakawan language spoken by Native Americans indigenous to the lower Rio Grande Valley of northeastern Mexico and extreme southern Texas (United States). Today it is extinct.

Vocabulary
The following vocabulary list of Cotoname is from John Swanton (1940).

{| class="wikitable sortable" style="font-size: 85%"
! gloss !! Cotoname
|-
| air || gurám
|-
| arm, right || katówan
|-
| arrow || ká-u
|-
| bad || kĕnáx, sá
|-
| bed || kắm
|-
| belly || kóx, kuwéle
|-
| below || éta
|-
| bird || komióm
|-
| bison || wiyá-u
|-
| black || baí (cf. night)
|-
| blade || ĕhiá-u
|-
| blanket, American || häwáss (cf. cold)
|-
| blood || sä'x
|-
| blow, to || pó-une
|-
| bow || kémma
|-
| boy || kuwósam
|-
| breast (female) || kĕnám
|-
| breechclout || xaguátema
|-
| buffalo || wiyá-u
|-
| cactus-fig || wámena
|-
| cane || ká-u
|-
| chair, a || náxe
|-
| chief || kapitán
|-
| cloth (a small piece of cloth) || huáxhe
|-
| cold || häwéss
|-
| come here! || sánxe
|-
| Comecrudo || Aranguá, xaíma
|-
| cow || wiyá-u
|-
| crane || karakór
|-
| cry, to || páma
|-
| dance, to || okáwe
|-
| day || ō'
|-
| daybreak || káma
|-
| deer || kĕmás
|-
| die, to || wátĕxo
|-
| dog || kowá-u
|-
| drink, to || xuáxe
|-
| dust || pó-una
|-
| earth || pén
|-
| east || otá-ume
|-
| eat, to || haháme
|-
| evening || ovx
|-
| eye || arókwan
|-
| face || makuát
|-
| far || huánpa
|-
| feathers || kuwai
|-
| female || nan
|-
| fire || mánĕx
|-
| flesh || kĕmás
|-
| fog || máyen
|-
| food || haháme
|-
| foot || ayésim
|-
| fox || kissá
|-
| girl || kuwósam
|-
| go over there! || awóyo!
|-
| goat || kápĕra
|-
| good || kĕnáx
|-
| goose || krák
|-
| grass || suá-u
|-
| great || katám
|-
| gun || komióp
|-
| guts || kuwéle
|-
| hair || makuát
|-
| handkerchief || huáxhe
|-
| hare || gamáro
|-
| hat || garópa
|-
| head || makuát
|-
| high || katám
|-
| hog || esmók
|-
| horn || yómo
|-
| horse || kokátere
|-
| Indian, an || xaíma
|-
| infant || huwáxe
|-
| iron || komióp
|-
| Karankawa || Aranguá
|-
| kill, to || wátxuka
|-
| knife || komiópo
|-
| knife (for cutting leather) || ĕhiá-u
|-
| land || pén
|-
| let us go! || awóyo
|-
| little || kuwósam
|-
| low (said of water) || xuắxe
|-
| maize || tawaló
|-
| maize-husk || wapxáp
|-
| male quadruped || yómo
|-
| man || xuaináxe
|-
| masticate, to || akwanámie
|-
| meat || kemás
|-
| mesquite-bush || dán
|-
| metate || komoí
|-
| milk || kĕnám
|-
| mouse || tsĕmáx
|-
| mud || pén
|-
| night || baí
|-
| no || sá
|-
| north || hayámta
|-
| nose || yá-ĕx
|-
| ox (young) || wiyá-u
|-
| painted (on body, face, etc.) || tháwĕ
|-
| peccary || kápio
|-
| Pintos (Indian tribe so called) || tháwĕ
|-
| pipe || pá-una
|-
| rabbit || kiáxhem
|-
| rat || tsĕmáx
|-
| red || msá-ĕ
|-
| reed || ká-u
|-
| rifle || komióp
|-
| Rio Grande river || áx̣, katám
|-
| river || áx̣, katám
|-
| run, to || mtára
|-
| salt || dá-än
|-
| scratch, to || átsiu
|-
| seat, a || náxe
|-
| sheep || séwuya
|-
| sing, to || koyáma
|-
| sit, to || páwe
|-
| sit down! || páwe
|-
| sleep, to || mátsĕkuka
|-
| small || kuwósam
|-
| smoke, to || pá-una, suá-u
|-
| snake || kiá-uxa
|-
| sombrero || garópa
|-
| south || séta
|-
| stand, to || páwia
|-
| star || kápra
|-
| stick || dópax
|-
| suck, to || huä'xle
|-
| sun || ō'
|-
| sweet || yáx
|-
| sweetmeats || yáx
|-
| tail (of animal) || ásuxuga
|-
| Tampacuás Indian || xaíma
|-
| tobacco || suá-u
|-
| tortilla || kamaplaí
|-
| tortoise || gapáx
|-
| tree || dópax
|-
| tuna || wámĕna
|-
| up the country || wéfta
|-
| velduque || ĕhiá-u
|-
| west || wéfta
|-
| what do you want? || titcháx mén?
|-
| water || áx̣
|-
| weep, to || xákue
|-
| west || wéfta
|-
| white || mesó-i
|-
| wind || gurám
|-
| wings || miápa
|-
| within || kuwéle
|-
| wolf || kombóx
|-
| woman || katám
|}

See also
Indigenous languages of the Americas
Comecrudan languages

References

External links

 Native American languages (in German)
 North and Central-American language families

Pakawan languages
Extinct languages of North America
Languages extinct in the 1900s
Indigenous languages of Texas
Coahuiltecan languages
Language isolates of North America